The Mermen are an American instrumental rock band from San Francisco, California formed in 1989. They have since moved to Santa Cruz, California.

The group's sound was originally rooted in surf and psychedelic rock music of the 1960s, although they have made "sincere attempts to get away from the surf music label" and currently delve into many genres, mainly driven by the melodic visions of the band's founder, songwriter, and guitarist Jim Thomas. The band's music is entirely instrumental and "does a good job of defying description". The Mermen perform as a power trio: electric guitar, electric bass, and drums, with occasional guests for live concerts. They were featured in the soundtrack of the Sony PlayStation video game Road Rash 3D and have contributed music for films as well.

The 2010 album, In God We Trust, was their first release in a decade. It was followed in December 2012 by their first full-length Christmas release, "Do You Hear What I Hear - A Very MERMEN Christmas".

Thomas also fronts The Shitones, an associated band that features some of the same personnel (Jennifer Burnes on bass, and Shigemi Komiyama on drums prior to his 2014 death.) While Mermen feature Thomas's original compositions almost exclusively, the Shitones are a cover band that emphasizes instrumental rock hits of the 1950s and '60s by the likes of Link Wray and The Ventures, along with instrumental versions of songs by Neil Young, The Grateful Dead, Jimi Hendrix and others.

Albums
 Krill Slippin''' (1989)
 Food for Other Fish (1994)
 Live at the Haunted House (1995)
 A Glorious Lethal Euphoria (1995)
 Songs of the Cows (1996)
 Only You (1997)
 Sunken Treasure (1999)
 The Amazing California Health and Happiness Road Show (2000)
 In God We Trust (2010)
 Blues of Elsewhere (Jim Thomas solo) (2011)
 Do You Hear What I Hear - A Very MERMEN Christmas (2012)
 We Could See it in the Distance (2017)
 The Magic Swirling Ship (2017)
 A Murmurous Sirenic Delirium (2019)
 Splendeurs Et Miseres (2021)

References

External links
 Mermen official website
 The Mermen live concerts at archive.org
 Mermen equipment recovered

Live shows
 Live At Cubberly Community Center - 20 March 1998
 Live At Slims - 5 January 2002
 Live At 19 Broadway - 11 December 2002
 Live At Great American Music Hall - 3 January 2003
 Live At Fernwood Resort- 19 July 2003
 Live At Mavericks Surf Shop - 27 February 2004
 Live At Half Moon Bay Yacht Club - 6 April 2008

Rock music groups from California
Surf music groups
Musical groups from San Francisco
American instrumental musical groups